Passionworks is the seventh studio album by American rock band Heart, released on August 20, 1983, by Epic Records. The album marks a shift in musical direction from hard rock and folk to mainstream rock. It is the first Heart album to feature Denny Carmassi and Mark Andes, who had replaced longtime members Mike Derosier and Steve Fossen. Passionworks was the band's final album with Epic Records before their comeback-fueled move to Capitol Records. It reached number 39 on the US Billboard 200. The album's lead single, "How Can I Refuse?", peaked at number 44 on the Billboard Hot 100 and topped the Hot Mainstream Rock Tracks chart for one week. The second single, "Allies", peaked at number 83 on the Billboard Hot 100.

On July 13, 2009, Passionworks was re-released in the United Kingdom by BGO Records as a double CD with the band's previous album Private Audition.

Remastering of tracks
Heart's sixteenth studio album, Beautiful Broken (2016), contains two remastered tracks from Passionworks, along with a few other remastered songs from their 1980s era and a few new ones. These two tracks are "Johnny Moon" and "Language of Love". In an interview with The Arizona Republic, Nancy Wilson explained the idea to remaster the songs, saying, "Like, 'Wow, these songs were so misunderstood production-wise.' And I thought I would love a chance to redesign and reimagine them in the studio."

Critical reception

Alex Henderson of AllMusic wrote, "Passionworks isn't recommended to casual listeners, but serious Heart devotees will find it to be an enjoyable way for the Wilson sisters to end their Epic period." Errol Somay of Rolling Stone felt that the album "seems like the soundtrack to an off-Broadway show that closed after two nights", concluding, "Almost totally lacking in hummable tunes and danceable rhythms, Passionworks does little more than showcase Ann Wilson's vocal pyrotechnics."

Track listing

Personnel
Credits adapted from the liner notes of Passionworks.

Heart
 Ann Wilson – lead vocals, background vocals
 Nancy Wilson – lead vocals, background vocals, rhythm guitars, lead guitars, acoustic guitars, synthesizers
 Howard Leese – lead guitars, rhythm guitars, background vocals, synthesizers
 Mark Andes – bass, background vocals
 Denny Carmassi – drums

Additional musicians
 Keith Olsen – arrangements
 David Paich – piano ; synthesizers 
 Steve Porcaro – synthesizers ; synthesizer programming
 Lynn Wilson – background vocals

Technical
 Keith Olsen – production, engineering
 Brian Foraker – engineering
 Dennis Sager – engineering
 Greg Fulginiti – mastering at Artisan Sound Recorders (California)

Artwork
 Neal Preston – concept, photography
 Tony Lane – art direction
 Isgo Lepejian – black-and-white photographic prints

Charts

References

1983 albums
Albums produced by Keith Olsen
Epic Records albums
Heart (band) albums